The 1828 United States presidential election in North Carolina took place between October 31 and December 2, 1828, as part of the 1828 United States presidential election. Voters chose 15 representatives, or electors to the Electoral College, who voted for President and Vice President.

North Carolina voted for the Democratic candidate, Andrew Jackson, over the National Republican candidate, John Quincy Adams. Jackson won North Carolina by a margin of 46.17%.

Results

References

North Carolina
1828
1828 North Carolina elections